Dany Cure (born 7 April 1990) is a Venezuelan footballer who plays for Deportivo La Guaira as a midfielder Previously, he played for Caracas FC as well as Carabobo FC.

External links

References

1990 births
Living people
Association football midfielders
Venezuelan footballers
Zulia F.C. players
Llaneros de Guanare players
Caracas FC players
Carabobo F.C. players
Once Caldas footballers
Águilas Doradas Rionegro players
The Strongest players
Central Córdoba de Santiago del Estero footballers
Boston River players
Venezuelan Primera División players
Categoría Primera A players
Bolivian Primera División players
Argentine Primera División players
Uruguayan Primera División players
Venezuela international footballers
Venezuelan expatriate footballers
Expatriate footballers in Colombia
Venezuelan expatriate sportspeople in Colombia
Expatriate footballers in Bolivia
Venezuelan expatriate sportspeople in Bolivia
Expatriate footballers in Argentina
Venezuelan expatriate sportspeople in Argentina
Expatriate footballers in Uruguay
Venezuelan expatriate sportspeople in Uruguay
People from Zulia
20th-century Venezuelan people
21st-century Venezuelan people